The 1930–31 season was Newport County's 11th season in the Football League. The club finished in 21st place and were not re-elected for the following season.

Season review

Results summary

Results by round

Fixtures and results

Third Division South

FA Cup

Welsh Cup

League table

Pld = Matches played; W = Matches won; D = Matches drawn; L = Matches lost; F = Goals for; A = Goals against;GA = Goal average; Pts = Points

Election

References

 Amber in the Blood: A History of Newport County.

External links
 Newport County 1930-1931 : Results
 Newport County football club match record: 1931
 Welsh Cup 1930/31

1930-31
English football clubs 1930–31 season
1930–31 in Welsh football